"The Water Nixie" or "The Water-Nix" is a fairy tale collected by the Brothers Grimm, tale number 79.  It came from Hanau.

It is Aarne-Thompson type 313A, the girl helps the hero flee and revolves about a transformation chase.  Others of this type include 
The Master Maid, Jean, the Soldier, and Eulalie, the Devil's Daughter, The Two Kings' Children, Nix Nought Nothing,  and Foundling-Bird.  The Grimms noted Sweetheart Roland as an analogue.

Synopsis

A brother and sister fell into a well, where a nixie caught them and made them work for her.  One Sunday while she was at church, they ran away.  The nixie chased them.  The girl threw a brush, which became a mountain with thousands of spikes, which the nixie got through with great effort.  The boy threw a comb behind them, which became mountains with thousands of teeth, which the nixie got through with great effort.  The girl threw a mirror behind them, which became a mountain too slick for the nixie to climb.  She went back to get an axe, but before she could chop through the mountain, they escaped.

See also
Farmer Weathersky

References

External links
SurLaLune Fairy Tale site The Water-Nix

Grimms' Fairy Tales
Fiction about shapeshifting
Female characters in fairy tales
Cases of people who fell into a well in fiction
ATU 300-399